Women in Transnistria are women who live in or are from Transnistria (may also be spelled as Transdniestria; and also known as the Pridnestrovian Moldavian Republic, abbreviated as PMR).

Population 
Based on the census conducted in 2004, 54% of 555,000 people are composed of women; of which 21% of those women are aged over 60 years old.

Employment 
Based on the census conducted in 2004, 37% of women have been employed, while 19% were unemployed. Retired women were at 35%.

Education 
According to the 2004 census, 50.1% of the population in Transnistria were students in the "professional and higher education" fields. 15.9% of the women have received higher education, but some may not have completed their higher education at educational institutions. 31.5% of the women received professional level education. 31.7% of the women received secondary level of education. 8.4 of the women received primary level of education.

Women in politics 

Although still a country with limited recognition internationally, and although Freedom in the World 2012 had described that "[w]omen are underrepresented in most positions of authority", the current Transnistrian government includes 8 women and 6 men. Prime Minister of Transnistria (Tatiana Turanskaya) and 3 Deputy Prime Ministers out of 4 are also women (Natalia Nikiforova, Nina Shtanski and Maija Parnas). Women are widely presented in Presidential Administration of Transnistria: both the head of Administration (Nadezhda Baranova) and all the 5 presidential advisors (Alyona Klyus, Nadezhda Zablotskaya, Natalia Garbar, Anna Yanchuk and Galina Sandutsa) are women.

Women are somewhat underrepresented as heads of State Administrations of cities and districts (raions) of Transnistria (only Rybnitsa district is headed by a woman), but are widely presented on posts of deputy heads of State Administrations. Currently 2 deputies out of 5 in Tiraspol administration, 2 out of 2 in Bendery administration, 2 out of 3 in Rybnitsa administration, 2 out of 3 in Dubăsari administration, 2 out of 3 in Grigoriopol administration and 2 out of 2 in Camenca administration are women.

Human trafficking 
Some women of Transnistria, including minors, have become victims of domestic violence, human trafficking, and prostitution, which are three of the major problems in the country. Most often, trafficked Transnistrian women and girls are brought to Turkey and the United Arab Emirates.

See also 
 Human rights in Transnistria
 Crime in Transnistria

References

External links 
 Lungu, Anna. Peaceful Conflict Transformation in Transnistria, European University Centre for Peace Studies 
 Transnistria The Giant Forgotten Cemetery,  History and Voices of the Tragedy in Romania and Transnistria, The Nizkor Project
 Transnistria, PEOPLE’S PEACEMAKING PERSPECTIVES MAY 2011
 Gupta, Vidushi (UNHRC journalist). Time to Thrive – Transnistria at Turning Point, 19/05/2013 
 Photo exhibition "Women of Transnistria: the diversity and uniqueness", UN WOMEN, saynotoviolence.org

People of Transnistria Governorate
Transnistrian people
Transnistrian women in politics
Transnistria